The Division of Illawarra was an Australian Electoral Division in the state of New South Wales. It covered part of the Illawarra region, after which it was named. The Division was proclaimed in 1900, and was one of the original 75 divisions to be contested at the first Federal election. It was abolished at the redistribution of 13 September 1922.

Its most notable member was George Fuller, who served as a minister under Alfred Deakin. After losing Illawarra to George Burns in 1913, Fuller would return to New South Wales Legislative Assembly, being elected to the seat of Wollondilly in 1915. Fuller would go on to become Premier of New South Wales on two non-consecutive occasions – in 1921, and then again from 1922 to 1925. Most notably, his first tenure as Premier lasted only seven hours on 20 December 1921 – by some distance the shortest serving ministry in Australian history.

Members

Election results

1901 establishments in Australia
Constituencies established in 1901
Illawarra